In economics, the Leontief production function or fixed proportions production function is a production function that implies the factors of production which will be used in fixed (technologically pre-determined) proportions, as there is no substitutability between factors. It was named after Wassily Leontief and represents a limiting case of the constant elasticity of substitution production function.

For the simple case of a good that is produced with two inputs, the function is of the form

where q is the quantity of output produced, z1 and z2 are the utilised quantities of input 1 and input 2 respectively, and a and b are technologically determined constants.

Example

Suppose that the intermediate goods "tires" and "steering wheels" are used in the production of automobiles (for simplicity of the example, to the exclusion of anything else). Then in the above formula q refers to the number of automobiles produced, z1 refers to the number of tires used, and z2 refers to the number of steering wheels used. Assuming each car is produced with 4 tires and 1 steering wheel, the Leontief production function is

Number of cars = Min{1⁄4 times the number of tires, 1 times the number of steering wheels}.

See also
 Cobb–Douglas production function
 Isoquant

References

Production economics